Mobilicoccus massiliensis is a Gram-positive, facultatively anaerobic non-spore-forming and motile bacterium from the genus of Mobilicoccus which has been isolated from feces of a human boy with kwashiorkor.

References

Micrococcales
Bacteria described in 2017